John Alfred Fisher (19 June 1925 – 17 January 2022) was an English footballer who played as a left-back in the Football League.

He was the twin brother of former Millwall fullback George Fisher. Fisher died on 17 January 2022, at the age of 96.

References

External links

1925 births
2022 deaths
English footballers
Footballers from Bermondsey
Association football fullbacks
English Football League players
Ramsgate F.C. players
Yeovil Town F.C. players
AFC Bournemouth players
Millwall F.C. players
Twin sportspeople
English twins